The following is a list of winners of the Golden Arena for Best Actress at the Pula Film Festival.

List of winners

Yugoslav Film Awards (1955–90)

Croatian Film Awards (1990–present)

Footnotes

A.  Although the festival was opened on 26 July 1991 and a press screening of Zrinko Ogresta's film Fragments: Chronicle of a Vanishing was held, the festival board presided by Antun Vrdoljak decided to cancel the festival in protest against the violence of the Ten-Day War which was going on in Slovenia and the initial stages of the Croatian War of Independence. Nine films were supposed to be screened in the competition program.

B. : The awards ceremony was cancelled in 1994 as only one Croatian feature film was made in the preceding 12 months (The Price of Life directed by Bogdan Žižić). The festival was held in spite of this, but the usual national competition program was replaced with a retrospective of animated films produced by the Zagreb School of Animated Film and a selection of documentaries, while the main program featured premieres of six American wide release movies.

Multiple winners
The following actresses have received multiple awards. The list is sorted by the number of total awards. Years in bold indicate wins in Yugoslav competition (1955–1990).

2 :  Majda Potokar (1963, 1965)
2 :  Milena Dravić (1962, 1970)
2 :  Dušica Žegarac (1960, 1971)
2 :  Milena Zupančič (1976, 1977)

2 :  Mirjana Karanović (1980, 1985)
2 :  Lucija Šerbedžija (1999, 2001)
2 :  Alma Prica (1993, 2003)
2 :  Nataša Dorčić (1996, 2007)

2 :  Daria Lorenci Flatz (2004, 2020)

References

External links
Web archive of past festival editions 1954–2013 at the Pula Film Festival official website 

Pula Film Festival
Film awards for lead actress
Awards established in 1955
1955 establishments in Yugoslavia